The 1970–71 South-West Indian Ocean cyclone season was an above-average cyclone season. The season officially ran from November 1, 1970, to April 30, 1971.

Systems

Tropical Disturbance Andree

Moderate Tropical Storm Betsy

Moderate Tropical Storm Andrea–Claudine 

 Andrea-Claudine, 10 November to 13 November 1970 in central Indian Ocean

Intense Tropical Cyclone Hilary–Dominique 

 Hilary, 11 to 18 December 1970 in central Indian Ocean

Moderate Tropical Storm Edith

Tropical Cyclone Felicie 

Cyclone Felicie was a slow moving cyclone that made a large number of landfalls in Madagascar, 4, in addition to a single landfall in Mozambique, which reportedly killed 30 people. The storm followed a very erratic track due to unusual steering patterns, and went through many cycles of strengthening and weakening as it slowly trudged to the south. Felicie reached Tropical Cyclone status three separate times, before finally becoming extratropical southwest of Madagascar.

Tropical Cyclone Myrtle–Ginette 

On January 19, Severe Tropical Cyclone Myrtle entered the South-West Indian Ocean; therefore, it was assigned a second name, Ginette. The next day, Ginette reached hurricane status and developed a clear eye as it traveled generally west-southwestward. On January 22, Ginette curved southwestward and came within  of the island of Rodrigues. Throughout the next two days, Ginette approached the island of Reunion, causing stormy weather that lasted until January 29. In Reunion, swells associated with Ginette reached  at times. On January 25, Ginette became stationary while located south of Reunion. The next day, Ginette encountered a ridge which caused it to execute a small clockwise loop. After completing the loop, Ginette accelerated southeastward and gradually weakened. By January 31, Ginette had transitioned into an extratropical cyclone.

Tropical Cyclone Helga 

On February 8, Helga passed southeast of Réunion and Mauritius, bringing heavy rainfall to the former island, reaching  at Commerson. Two people died on the island due to drowning.

Tropical Cyclone Tilly-Iphigenie

Tropical Cyclone Joelle

Tropical Cyclone Kalinka

Tropical Cyclone Yvonne–Lise

Intense Tropical Cyclone Maggie–Muriel 

 Maggie/Muriel, 7 to 20 March 1971 in central Indian Ocean

Tropical Cyclone Nelly

See also 

 Atlantic hurricane seasons: 1970, 1971
 Eastern Pacific hurricane seasons: 1970, 1971
 Western Pacific typhoon seasons: 1970, 1971
 North Indian Ocean cyclone seasons: 1970, 1971

References 

1970–71 Southern Hemisphere tropical cyclone season
South-West Indian Ocean cyclone seasons